Jean-Baptiste Troppmann (October 5, 1849 – January 19, 1870) 
was a French spree killer who between August 24 and September 19, 1869, murdered eight members of the Kinck family, including six children aged between 2 and 16 years old, in order to gain access to their money. He was caught at the port of Le Havre at the end of September 1869 while attempting to flee the country.

Convicted after a three-day trial on December 30, 1869, Troppmann was executed publicly by guillotine outside the gates of La Roquette Prisons on January 19, 1870.

His murders, trial, and execution were extensively reported in the French press, and this reporting was a major milestone in the development of the French tabloid press (the petite presse or the presse à un sou.) For example, Le Petit Journal, the bestselling newspaper in France, more than doubled its daily circulation, selling 594,000 copies the day of Troppmann's execution.

The Attorney General at Paris, Théodore Grandperret, gained much attention for his indictment of Troppmann.
He receives an offhand mention in Mikhail Bakunin's book God and the State, written a few months after his execution, and his execution was witnessed and written about by Ivan Turgenev. A reference is made to Troppman in Rimbaud’s sonnet “Paris” written in 1871;
and also in Hopscotch by Julio Cortázar.

Bibliography 
 .

References

1849 births
1870 deaths
French spree killers
Mikhail Bakunin
French mass murderers